Jerzy Słupecki (1904–1987) was a Polish mathematician and logician.

Life
He attended the seminar of, and wrote a 1938 doctorate under, Jan Łukasiewicz.

During WWII he was active in Żegota.

In 1963, when at Wroclaw University, where he had been since 1945, he became editor of Studia Logica.

Works
Słupecki showed how the many-valued logics of Łukasiewicz could be included in the theory of Post systems, and gave a functionally complete version of the three-valued logic. In the logic of categorical sentences, he found a rule that made the theory decidable; his work on Aristotle's logic, from 1948, was later reprinted in French.

He also continued the work of Stanisław Leśniewski, and wrote on his system ("protothetics") in 1953, in Studia Logica. A survey, "The Logical Works of Jerzy Slupecki", appeared in Studia Logica XLVIII (1989), by Jan Woleński and Jan Zygmunt.

He published:

Z zagadnień logiki i filozofii: pisma wybrane (1961, editor), selected works of Jan Łukasiewicz
Elements of Mathematical Logic and Set Theory (1967)

Notes

External links
Selection from Jan Woleński and Jan Zygmunt, "Jerzy Słupecki (1904–1987): Life and Work", Studia Logica 48 (1989), 401–411

1904 births
1981 deaths
Polish mathematicians
Polish logicians
Academic staff of the University of Wrocław
Żegota members
20th-century Polish philosophers